Edgar Charles Barnes (6 April 1909 – 27 December 1987) was a pioneer in the field of industrial hygiene and the first industrial hygienist to work for a major U.S. corporation. He was also a founding member and director of the Health Physics Society.

References

1909 births
1987 deaths
Penn State College of Engineering alumni
American industrial engineers
Public health researchers
Health physicists
Health Physics Society
20th-century American engineers